Coleophora eilatica is a moth of the family Coleophoridae. It is found in Iran, Israel, Morocco, the United Arab Emirates, Oman and Yemen.

References

eilatica
Moths described in 1994
Moths of Asia
Moths of Africa